National Defence Complex (NDC), also known as National Development Complex, National Development Centre, is a Pakistani state-owned defence and aerospace contractor which is a division under the National Engineering and Scientific Commission (NESCOM). It is based in Fateh Jang, Rawalpindi, Pakistan.

Founded in 1990 at the MoD, the NDC engaged in research and development in space-based missile systems and expanded its services towards developing the land-based weapons systems for the army as well as naval systems for the navy.

History
The National Development Complex (NDC) is an aerospace and defence agency of the Ministry of Defence of Government of Pakistan, located in Fateh Jang, Punjab Province. The NDC was founded in 1990 by the Pakistan Atomic Energy Commission (PAEC) chairman, Munir Ahmad Khan, when PAEC's Director for Special Development Works (SDW) was morphed into the National Development Complex. Samar Mubarakmand was appointed as its first director and later became its director-general. While the project was initiated by Benazir Bhutto, who strongly advocated for the establishment, the NDC was completed in 1993 by Prime Minister Nawaz Sharif, and the Shaheen Missile System program was assigned to the NDC in 1995. The development of a missile program, under the codename Integrated Missile Research and Development Programme (IMRDP), was first started at the NDC to develop the solid-fuel rockets and missile systems. The missile components from these various facilities are brought to the NDC for final integration. The NDC operates under NESCOM whose engineers also participate in the projects.

Research, development and production

Missiles
 Air-to-air missile research – It was reported in November 2001 that the Aerospace Division of NDC was doing "preliminary studies" for developing a new medium range air-to-air missile. According to the report no full scale hardware had yet been built but investigations by NDC engineers into various design approaches were ongoing. The report stated that suggested that the missile may use active radar homing.
 Babur
 Nasr
 Shaheen-I
 Shaheen-II

Depleted uranium ammunition
 105 mm anti-tank round – a DU APFSDS anti-tank round developed to be fired by Type 59 tanks (upgraded with 105 mm guns) in service with the Pakistan Army. Reported to have a muzzle velocity of 1,450 m/s and be capable of penetrating 450 mm of rolled homogeneous armour (RHA) at an unspecified range.
 Naiza (125 mm anti-tank round) – a DU APFSDS anti-tank round developed to be fired by T-80UD tanks in service with the Pakistan Army. A model of the round was put on display at the IDEX 2001 exhibition in the United Arab Emirates and it was stated to have a DU long rod penetrator, performance 25% greater than NDC's 105 mm DU round and a saddle-type sabot with re-arranged forward bore-rider for more accurate alignment with the T-80UD's autoloader. Displayed at IDEAS 2002 alongside DU rounds produced by other Pakistani organisations. Reportedly named "Naiza", made compatible with the T-80UD tank and stated to be capable of penetrating 550 mm of RHA.

Other
 Starfish naval mine – a naval mine that targets submarines and ships, details on the mine were first released in 2001. Can be deployed by aircraft, ships and submarines. Makes use of solid state electronics. The mine's attack modes are controlled by a microprocessor which uses magnetic, acoustic and pressure sensors to analyse a potential target's signature. Sensors are mounted flush to both ends of the mine's cylindrical (barrel) shape. It is unknown if the mine has a self-destruct mechanism. Weight: 767 kg, warhead: 500 kg HE (PBX charge), storage life: 20 years.

See also
 National Engineering and Scientific Commission

References

Companies based in Rawalpindi
Nuclear technology in Pakistan
Military research of Pakistan
Nawaz Sharif administration
Aerospace companies of Pakistan
Defence companies of Pakistan
1990 establishments in Pakistan
Guided missile manufacturers
Rocket engine manufacturers